The Sulkovian dialect (Silesian: sulkowski djalekt) is one of the Silesian dialects, extracted by Feliks Steuer in his work Dialekt sułkowski (1934). It is a part of the Silesian-Lach border dialects; its name derives from Steuer's native village Sulków.

The works Ostatni gwojźdźaurz and Z naszej źymjy ślůnskej were written in this dialect.

The characteristic features of Sulkovian phonology are:
 the evolution of former long a into au, pronounced ;
 keeping of hard k and g in the combinations ky and gy, e.g. okynka (windows), pługy (ploughs);
 so-called "anticipation of softness" - adding the consonant j, e.g. kujźńa (smithy);
the evolution of nasal vowel at the end of a word into am, e.g. cebulam (onion, the accusative case).

Example

References 

Silesian language